Loch Morlich (Scottish Gaelic, Loch Mhùrlaig) is a freshwater loch in the Badenoch and Strathspey area of Highland, Scotland near Aviemore. The loch is home to a watersports centre with kayaking, sailing and windsurfing among the activities available. There is also a yacht club and cycling routes around the loch. The loch is at the foot of the Cairngorm mountains, just a few miles from Aviemore. As seen on Game of Thrones Season 5.

Long stretches of its shoreline are formed of sandy beaches. In 2009 these beaches received a Seaside Award by the Keep Scotland Beautiful (KSB) campaign, the first time that this had been given to a fresh water loch. At 300 metres above sea level it also became the highest beach to be given this award.

When examined closely the sand of these beaches contains large amounts of broken glass.  However, this glass does not come from careless tourists discarding bottles irresponsibly, but is in fact left over from the Second World War when the area around Loch Morlich was used as a commando school.  In particular it was used as a training area for the Kompani Linge (the Norwegian Independent (army) Company, trained by the British Special Operations Executive) because of the close resemblance of the area, both in landscape and climate, to Norway.  A memorial to the Kompani Linge can be found outside the Glenmore Forest Park visitor centre.

References

External links

Loch Morlich beach - Forestry Commission Scotland
Keep Scotland Beautiful - Awards
Loch Morlich Watersports

Morlich
Morlich
Sports venues in Highland (council area)
Morlich
Morlich
Beaches of Scotland
Landforms of Highland (council area)